Kryvyi Rih National University, colloquially known as KNU is located in Kryvyi Rih, one of the main industrial cities of Ukraine. Currently, its structure consists of seven faculties (academic departments) and five institutes. It was founded in 1922 as the Kryvyi Rih Evening Working College, and reorganized onto Kryvyi Rih Mining University. During the Soviet Union era, Kryvyi Rih University was one of the top professional universities in the USSR. In 2011 Cabinet of Ukraine founded Kryvyi Rih National University by uniting Technic University, Pedagogical University, Economic Institute of Kyiv National Economic University and Department of the National Metallurgical Academy of Ukraine. It is ranked as one of the best universities in Ukraine in many rankings (see below).

History
In 1929 the college was converted into the evening working institution, and from 1931 in Kryvyi Rihv Mining Institute.

Next year in Kryvyi Rih, the Institute of Vocational Training was founded. It was reorganized in Pedagogical Institute. In the prewar period, the institute trained about 1,000 teachers. In 1999, the basis of the State Pedagogical Institute was established Kryvyi Rih State Pedagogical University.

During World War II, being evacuated from 20 September 1941 to August 1944, Kryvyi Rih Mining Institute worked in Nizhny Tagil. In September 1944 Institute resumed classes for the students in the hometown. Increasing number of specialties, which prepared the engineering staff. Five teachers honored with the Lenin and State Prizes. Since 1994 the institute became charter Technical University.

The proclamation of the independence of Ukraine in 1991 brought about radical changes in every sphere of University life. In 2011 Cabinet of Ukraine founded Kryvyi Rih National University by uniting Mining Institute, Pedagogical University, Economic Institute of Kyiv National Economic University and Department of the National Metallurgical Academy of Ukraine.

Organisation and administration

Schools / Faculties
These are the 7 faculties into which the university is divided:

Institutes

Other institutes
 Industrial College,
 Polytechnic College,
 Ingulets College,
 Kryvyi Rih Mining College,
 Mining Electromechanical College,
 Motor Transport Technical College.

Academics

Foreign Partner Universities
The University currently maintains relations and, in some cases, student exchange programs with universities of forty countries; a figure which includes a number of former republics of the Soviet Union and other countries which Ukraine traditionally, over the past 70 years prior to independence in 1991, did not have official bilateral relations with. A small selection of partner universities is displayed below.

Campus

Library
The library of KNU originated in 1922. The library holds over 1.7 million physical volumes, and more than 7,000 of these books are referred as rare and valuable. Library staff are making great efforts to promote reading. Regularly held book exhibitions, literature reviews, readers' conferences, thematic and literary evenings, book presentations, meetings with famous people in the city, including writers and journalists.

More than 500,000 readers visit the library each year, and it loans more than 1 million books annually. Digital access to library started to work on 2005.

Notable alumni and faculty 

Oleksandr Vilkul
Petro Dyminskyi
Olena Zelenska

References

External links

 
Educational institutions established in 2011
Universities and colleges in Kryvyi Rih
2011 establishments in Ukraine
National universities in Ukraine